Bulinac  is a village in Croatia. It is connected by the D28 highway.

Notable natives
Lavoslav Singer, Croatian industrialist

Populated places in Bjelovar-Bilogora County